Carmel-by-the-Sea, often simply called Carmel, is a city in Monterey County, California, United States, founded in 1902 and incorporated on October 31, 1916. Situated on the Monterey Peninsula, Carmel is known for its natural scenery and rich artistic history. In 1906, the San Francisco Call devoted a full page to the "artists, writers and poets at Carmel-by-the-Sea", and in 1910 it reported that 60 percent of Carmel's houses were built by citizens who were "devoting their lives to work connected to the aesthetic arts." Early City Councils were dominated by artists, and several of the city's mayors have been poets or actors, including Herbert Heron, founder of the Forest Theater, bohemian writer and actor Perry Newberry, and actor-director Clint Eastwood, who served as mayor from 1986 to 1988.

Communities near Carmel-by-the-Sea include Carmel Valley and Carmel Highlands. The larger town of Monterey borders Carmel to the north.

As of the 2020 census, the town had a total population of 3,220, down from 3,722 at the 2010 census.

History
Carmel-by-the-Sea is in an area permeated by Native American, Spanish, Mexican and American history. Most scholars believe that the Esselen-speaking people were the first Native Americans to inhabit the area of Carmel, but the Ohlone people pushed them south into the mountains of Big Sur around the 6th century.

Spanish Mission settlement 

The first Europeans to see this land were Spanish mariners led by Juan Rodríguez Cabrillo in 1542, who sailed up the California coast without landing. Another sixty years passed before another Spanish explorer, Sebastián Vizcaíno discovered for Spain what is now known as Carmel Valley in 1602. It is thought that he named the river running through the valley Rio Carmelo in honor of the three Carmelite friars serving as chaplains for the voyage.

The Spanish did not attempt to colonize the area until 1770, when Gaspar de Portolá, along with Franciscan priests Junípero Serra and Juan Crespí, visited the area in search of a mission site. Portolà and Crespí traveled by land while Serra traveled with the Mission supplies aboard ship, arriving eight days later. The colony of Monterey was established at the same time as the second mission in Alta California and soon became the capital of California, remaining so until 1849. From the late 18th through the early 19th century most of the Ohlone population died out from European diseases (against which they had no immunity), as well as overwork and malnutrition at the missions where the Spanish forced them to live. When Mexico gained independence from Spain in 1821 Carmel became Mexican territory.

Mission San Carlos and Junípero Serra

Mission San Carlos Borromeo de Carmelo was founded on 3 June 1770 in the nearby settlement of Monterey, but was relocated to Carmel Valley by Junípero Serra due to interactions between soldiers stationed at the nearby Presidio and the native Indians.

In December 1771 the transfer was complete as the new stockade of approximately 130x200 became the new Mission Carmel. Simple buildings of plastered mud were the first church and dwellings until a more sturdy structure was built of wood from nearby pine and cypress trees to last through the seasonal rains. This, too, was only a temporary church until a permanent stone edifice was built.

In 1784 Serra, after one last tour of all the California missions, died and was buried, at his request, at the Mission in the Sanctuary of the San Carlos Church, next to Crespí, who had passed the previous year. Serra was buried with full military honors.

Carmel Mission has importance beyond the history of Serra, who is sometimes called the "Father of California". It also contains the state's first library.

Township 

Carmel became part of the United States in 1848, when Mexico ceded California as a result of the Mexican–American War. 

In the 1850s, "Rancho Las Manzanitas", the area that was to become Carmel-by-the-Sea, was purchased by French businessman Honoré Escolle. Escolle was well known and prosperous in the City of Monterey, owning the first commercial bakery, pottery kiln, and brickworks in Central California. His descendants, the Tomlinson-Del Piero Family, still live throughout the area. 

William Martin of Scotland arrived in Monterey in 1856 by ship with his family. His son, John Martin (1827-1893), bought land around the Carmel River from Lafayette F. Loveland in 1859. He built the Martin Ranch on  that went as far as the Carmel River to the homes along Carmel-by-the-Sea. The ranch became known as the Mission Ranch because it was so close to the Carmel Mission. They farmed potatoes and barley and had a milk dairy.

In 1888, Escolle and Santiago J. Duckworth, a young developer from Monterey with dreams of establishing a Catholic retreat near the Carmel Mission, filed a subdivision map with the County Recorder of Monterey County. By 1889, 200 lots had been sold. A post office called Carmel opened in 1889, closed in 1890, re-opened in 1893, moved in 1902, and closed for good in 1903. Abbie Jane Hunter, founder of the San Francisco-based Women's Real Estate Investment Company, first used the name "Carmel-by-the-Sea" on a promotional postcard.

In 1902 James Franklin Devendorf and Frank Hubbard Powers, on behalf of the Carmel Development Company, filed a new subdivision map of the core village that became Carmel. They asked Michael J. Murphy to help build the houses. From 1902 to 1940, he built nearly 350 buildings in Carmel. The Carmel post office opened the same year. In 1906, Fritz Schweninger (1867-1918) opened the first bakery on Ocean Avenue, called the Carmel Bakery.  In 1910, the Carnegie Institution established the Coastal Laboratory, and a number of scientists moved to the area. Carmel incorporated in 1916. In 1925, Paul Aiken Flanders  built the Flanders Mansion and used his home as a model for the Hatton Fields subdivision. The City of Carmel purchased the Flanders Mansion and adjoining 14.9 acres in 1972, from the Flanders heirs for $275,000. It has become part of the 34-acre Mission Trail Nature Preserve. Part of this property is now the Rowntree Native Plant Garden at 25800 Hatton Road.

In 1932, the city developed the Devendorf Park that occupies the block of Ocean Avenue and Junipero Street. The city park is Carmel's central gathering place for outdoor events. The park is close to downtown shopping, the Carmel beach, and California State Route 1.

Arts colony

In 1905, the Carmel Arts and Crafts Club was formed to support and produce artistic works. After the 1906 San Francisco earthquake, the village was inundated with musicians, writers, painters and other creatives, all arriving to the growing artists’ colony after their bayside city was utterly devastated. These new residents were offered home lots – ten dollars as a down payment, little or no interest, and whatever they could afford to pay on a monthly basis.

Jack London described the artists' colony in his novel The Valley of the Moon.  Among the noted writers who lived in, or frequented, the village were Mary Austin, Nora May French, Robinson Jeffers, Sinclair Lewis, George Sterling and his protégé Clark Ashton Smith, and Upton Sinclair. Visual artists of Carmel in the early twentieth century included Anne Bremer, Ferdinand Burgdorff, E. Charlton Fortune, Arnold Genthe, Percy Gray, Armin Hansen, Alice MacGowan, Charles Rollo Peters, William Frederic Ritschel, and Sydney J. Yard.

The Carmel Arts and Crafts Club held exhibitions, lectures, dances, and produced plays and recitals at numerous locations in Carmel, including the Pine Inn Hotel, the Old Bath House on Ocean Ave, the Forest Theater, a small building in the downtown area donated by the Carmel Development Company, and finally, purchasing their own lot on Casanova Street, where they built their own clubhouse in 1907.

In 1911, the town became host to what became an ongoing tradition of presenting plays by Shakespeare with a production of Twelfth Night, directed by Garnet Holme of UC Berkeley and featuring future mayors Perry Newberry and Herbert Heron, with settings designed by artist Mary DeNeale Morgan. Twelfth Night was again presented in 1940 at Heron's inaugural Carmel Shakespeare Festival, and was repeated in 1942 and 1956.

By 1914, the club had achieved national recognition, with an article in The Mercury Herald commenting that "a fever of activity seems to have seized the community and each newcomer is immediately inoculated and begins with great enthusiasm to do something ... with plays, studios and studies".

Geography

Planning and environmental factors 

The town has historically pursued a vigorous strategy of planned development to enhance its natural coastal beauty and to retain its character, which the city's general plan describes as "a village in a forest overlooking a white sand beach". Carmel-by-the-Sea was incorporated in the year 1916 and as early as 1925 the town adopted a clear vision of its future as "primarily, essentially and predominantly a residential community" (Carmel-by-the-Sea City Council, 1929). The city regularly hosts delegations from cities and towns around the world seeking to understand how the village retains its authenticity in today's increasingly homogeneous world.

New buildings must be built around existing trees and new trees are required on lots that are deemed to have an inadequate number.

The one-square-mile village has no street lights or parking meters. In addition, the businesses, cottages and houses have no street numbers. (Originally, the early artists who were the first builders of the homes in the town, named their houses, rather than having numerical addresses.) Due to this situation, the Postal Service provides no delivery of mail to individual addresses.  Instead, residents go to the centrally located post office to receive their mail. Overnight delivery services do deliver to what are called geographical addresses, such as "NE Ocean and Lincoln" (Harrison Memorial Library) or "Monte Verde 4SW of 8th" (Golden Bough Playhouse). The format used for geographical addressing lists the street, cross street, and the number of houses from the intersection. For example, in the case of "Monte Verde 4SW of 8th", the address translates to a building on the west side of Monte Verde Street four properties south of the 8th Avenue intersection.

Planning has consistently recognized the importance of preserving the character of these major sociocultural and public facilities: Sunset Center, Golden Bough Playhouse, Forest Theater, Mission San Carlos Borromeo de Carmelo, Tor House and Hawk Tower, Harrison Memorial Library, and Carmel City Hall.

Carmel-by-the-Sea is situated in a moderate seismic risk zone, the principal threats being the San Andreas Fault, which is approximately thirty miles northeast, and the Palo Colorado Fault which traces offshore through the Pacific Ocean several miles away. More minor potentially active faults nearby are the Church Creek Fault and the San Francisquito Fault.

Marine protected areas
Carmel Pinnacles State Marine Reserve, Carmel Bay State Marine Conservation Area, Point Lobos State Marine Reserve and Point Lobos State Marine Conservation Area are marine protected areas in the waters around Carmel.  Like underwater parks, these marine protected areas help conserve ocean wildlife and marine ecosystems.

Climate

Carmel-by-the-Sea experiences a cool summer Mediterranean climate (Köppen climate classification Csb) normal in coastal areas of California.  Summers are typically mild, with overcast mornings produced by marine layer clouds which can bring drizzles that typically give way to clear skies in the afternoon.

The wet season is from October to May.

Transportation
Carmel-by-the-Sea is a quiet town and does not have any big roads. The biggest by a wide margin is Cabrillo Highway, generally called "Highway 1", which at the northern border of town becomes a limited-access freeway where it enters Monterey at exit 399. The freeway goes north toward San Francisco, connecting to U.S. Highway 101.

South of Carpenter Street in the northeast corner of Carmel, Highway 1 changes from a freeway to a two-lane surface road with many at-grade intersections, some signalized, as it remains through town and for a long distance south of Carmel. Some have proposed turning the intersection with Carpenter Street into an interchange as exit 398, but no official proposals have been made. South of Carmel, the highway follows the scenic Big Sur coast before eventually reaching bigger cities such as Santa Barbara and Los Angeles far south of Carmel. However, avoiding the Big Sur Coast and taking the 101 freeway to these cities is much faster, and Highway 1 frequently closes along the Big Sur Coast during rainy season due to mudslides, occasionally for months at a time due to the damage. These landslides usually do not happen near Carmel, however.

Carmel's other major street is Ocean Avenue, which serves as the town's main business district and goes straight from Highway 1 to the beach. An entrance gate to the 17 Mile Drive, a scenic road along the Monterey Bay coast, is located just inside Carmel's northern city limits.

Local transportation is provided by Monterey–Salinas Transit. Amtrak Thruway Motorcoach provides connections to intercity train service in Salinas.

Demographics

2010

The 2010 United States Census reported that Carmel-by-the-Sea had a population of 3,722. The racial makeup of Carmel-by-the-Sea was 3,464 (93.1%) White, 11 (0.3%) African American, 8 (0.2%) Native American, 111 (3.0%) Asian, 6 (0.2%) Pacific Islander, 45 (1.2%) from other races, and 77 (2.1%) from two or more races. Hispanic or Latino of any race were 174 persons (4.7%).

The Census reported that 3,722 people (100% of the population) lived in households, 0 (0%) lived in non-institutionalized group quarters, and 0 (0%) were institutionalized.

There were 2,095 households, out of which 254 (12.1%) had children under the age of 18 living in them, 831 (39.7%) were opposite-sex married couples living together, 138 (6.6%) had a female householder with no husband present, 50 (2.4%) had a male householder with no wife present.  There were 81 (3.9%) unmarried opposite-sex partnerships, and 20 (1.0%) same-sex married couples or partnerships. 934 households (44.6%) were made up of individuals, and 471 (22.5%) had someone living alone who was 65 years of age or older. The average household size was 1.78.  There were 1,019 families (48.6% of all households); the average family size was 2.39.

The population was spread out, with 381 people (10.2%) under the age of 18, 114 people (3.1%) aged 18 to 24, 544 people (14.6%) aged 25 to 44, 1,355 people (36.4%) aged 45 to 64, and 1,328 people (35.7%) who were 65 years of age or older.  The median age was 59.2 years. For every 100 females, there were 77.6 males.  For every 100 females age 18 and over, there were 76.9 males.

The homeowner vacancy rate was 5.3%; the rental vacancy rate was 8.8%.  2,198 people (59.1% of the population) lived in owner-occupied housing units and 1,524 people (40.9%) lived in rental housing units.

Economy
Major employers in Carmel-by-the-Sea include the La Playa Carmel hotel, Carmel Realty, and the restaurants Forge in the Forest, Il Fornaio, Portabella, Folktale Winery and Casanova.

Arts and culture

Theatre arts 

In 1907 the town's first cultural center and theatre, the Carmel Arts and Crafts Clubhouse, was built.  Poets Austin and Sterling performed their "private theatricals" there.

By 1913, The Arts and Crafts Club had begun organizing lessons for aspiring painters, actors, and craftsmen.  Some of the most prominent painters in the United States offered instruction for beginners and advanced students, including William Merritt Chase, Xavier Martinez, Mary DeNeale Morgan, C. P. Townsley, Matteo Sandona, C. Chapel Judson, and James Blanding Sloan.  It was Sloan and his wife who organized Carmel's first international film festival.

In 1924, the Arts and Crafts Hall was built on an adjacent site. This new facility was renamed numerous times including the Abalone Theatre, the Filmarte, the Carmel Playhouse and, finally, the Studio Theatre of the Golden Bough.  The original clubhouse, along with the adjoining theatre, burned down in 1949.

The facilities were rebuilt as a two-theatre complex; the theater opened in 1952 as the Golden Bough Playhouse. A photo of the fire from 1949 was still on file 60 years later at the rebuilt theatre illustrating the loss to the city's culture and history.

The dramas enacted by the Arts & Crafts Club attracted considerable attention, with an article in The Clubwoman noting;

In 1910, the Forest Theater, one of the first outdoor theaters west of the Rockies, was built, with poet Mary Austin and actor/director Herbert Heron leading the endeavor. Numerous groups including the Carmel Arts & Crafts Club, Forest Theater Society (1910) and the Western Drama Society (1911) presented plays and pageants. Original works and the plays of Shakespeare were the primary focus. The property was deeded to the City of Carmel-by-the-Sea in order to qualify for federal funding and, in 1939, the site became a Works Progress Administration (WPA) reconstruction project. After several years, the site re-opened as The Carmel Shakespeare Festival, with Herbert Heron as its director and, with the exception of the World War II years of 1943–44, the festival continued through the 1940s.

Theatrical activities in the town grew to such a proportion that between 1922 and 1924, two competing indoor theatres were built – the Arts & Crafts Hall and the Theatre of the Golden Bough, designed and built by Edward G. Kuster and originally located on Ocean Avenue. Kuster was a musician and lawyer from Los Angeles who relocated to Carmel to establish his own theatre and school.

In 1935, after a production of By Candlelight, the Golden Bough was destroyed by fire. Kuster, who had previously bought out the Arts and Crafts Theatre, moved his operation to the older facility and renamed it the Golden Bough Playhouse. In 1949, after remounting By Candlelight, the playhouse again burned to the ground.  It was rebuilt and reopened in 1952.

In 1931, the Carmel Sunset School constructed a new auditorium, complete with Gothic-inspired architecture, with seating for 700. Often doubling as a performing arts venue for the community, the facility was bought by the City of Carmel-by-the-Sea in 1964, renaming the venue the Sunset Theatre. In 2003, following a $22 million renovation, the building re-opened with the 66th annual Carmel Bach Festival, hosting such renowned artists as Lyle Lovett, k.d.lang, Wynston Marsalis, and the Vienna Boys' Choir.

In 1949, the first Forest Theater Guild was organized. For most of the 1960s, the outdoor theater lay unused and neglected, with the original Forest Theater Guild having ceased operations in 1961. In 1968, Marcia Hovick's Children's Experimental Theater leased the indoor theater and continued until 2010. In 1972, a new Forest Theater Guild was incorporated and continues to produce musicals, adding a film series in 1997.

In 1984, Pacific Repertory Theatre initiated productions on the outdoor Forest Theater stage, reactivating Herbert Heron's Carmel Shake-speare Festival in 1990 which, in 1994, expanded to include productions at the Golden Bough Playhouse.
Pacific Repertory Theatre (PacRep), a regional theatre company, is the only year-round professional (Equity) company in the Carmel area.  One of the eight major arts institutions in Monterey County, it was founded in 1982 by Carmel resident Stephen Moorer as the GroveMont Theatre.  Its name was changed to Pacific Repertory Theatre in 1994 when the company acquired the Golden Bough Playhouse, a two-theatre complex housing both the Golden Bough and the Circle Theatres. PacRep presents a year-round season of 10–12 plays and musicals in three Carmel theatres: The 330-seat Golden Bough Theatre, the 120-seat Circle Theatre and the 540-seat outdoor Forest Theater.  Annual outreach programs include PacRep's School of Dramatic Arts (SoDA) and the Tix4Kids program that distributes subsidized theatre tickets to underserved youth.

Literary arts 

In 1905, poet George Sterling came to Carmel and helped to establish the town's literary base. He was associated with Mary Austin, as well as Jack London, who also spent considerable time in the Carmel and Monterey area. In San Francisco, Sterling was known as the "uncrowned King of Bohemia" and, following the great San Francisco earthquake of 1906 many of his literary associates followed him in his move. He is often credited with making Carmel world-famous. His aunt Missus Havens purchased a home for him in Carmel Pines where he lived for six years.

Sterling wrote to his long-time literary mentor, Ambrose Bierce;
"Well, you can see why I must raise vegetables. Belgian hares, hens and the fruit of their wombs, squabs and goldfish, 'keep a bee,' raid mussel reefs, and cultivate a taste for rice – not to mention cold water and 'just one girl.' I'm determined to get into black and white unnumbered multitudes of lines that romp up and down in my innards, eight a-breast."

Sterling's visitors included poet Joaquin Miller, writer Charles W. Stoddard and photographer Arnold Genthe, known for his documentary shots of the San Francisco fire that followed the great earthquake, after which Genthe followed Sterling to Carmel to make his residence.

In 1905, novelist Mary Austin moved to Carmel. She is best known for her tribute to the deserts of the American Southwest, The Land of Little Rain. Her play, Fire, which she also directed, had its world premiere at the Forest Theater in 1913. Austin is often credited as suggesting the idea for the outdoor stage.

In 1914, poet Robinson Jeffers (1887–1962), and his wife, Una (1884–1950), found their "inevitable place" when they first saw the Carmel-Big Sur coast south of California's Monterey Peninsula. Among the many contributors to the lore of Mary Austin and Robinson Jeffers was the Carmel landscape photographer Morley Baer, whose photographs, published in two books, complemented their writings.

Over the next decade, on a windswept, barren promontory, using granite boulders gathered from the rocky shore of Carmel Bay, Jeffers built Tor House as a home and refuge for himself and his family. It was in Tor House that Jeffers wrote all of his major poetical works: the long narratives of "this coast crying out for tragedy," the shorter meditative lyrics and dramas on classical themes, culminating in 1947 with the critically acclaimed adaptation of Medea for the Broadway stage, which featured Dame Judith Anderson in the title role. He called his home Tor House, naming it for the craggy knoll, the "tor" on which it was built. Carmel Point, then, was a treeless headland, almost devoid of buildings. Construction began in 1918. The granite stones were drawn by horses from the little cove below the house. Jeffers apprenticed himself to the building contractor, thus learning the art of making "stone love stone." Construction was completed in mid-1919.

In 1920, the poet-builder began his work on Hawk Tower. Meant as a retreat for his wife and sons, it was completed in less than four years. Jeffers built the tower entirely by himself.  He used wooden planks and a block and tackle system to move the stones and to set them in place. Many influential literary and cultural celebrities were guests of the Jeffers family.  Among them were Sinclair Lewis, Edna St. Vincent Millay, Langston Hughes, Charles Lindbergh, George Gershwin and Charlie Chaplin.  Later visitors have included William Everson, Robert Bly, Czesław Miłosz and Edward Abbey.

Visual arts

In 1906, San Francisco photographer Arnold Genthe joined the Carmel arts colony, where he was able to pursue his pioneering work in color photography. His first attempts were taken in his garden, primarily portraits of his friends, including the leading Shakespearean actor and actress of the period, Edward Sothern and Julia Marlowe, who were costumed as Macbeth and Lady Macbeth. Of his new residence, he wrote, "My first trials with this medium were made at Carmel where the cypresses and rocks of Point Lobos, the always varying sunsets and the intriguing shadows of the sand dunes offered a rich field for color experiments."

According to the Library of Congress, where over 18,000 of his negatives and prints are on file, Genthe "became famous for his impressionistic portrayals of society women, artists, dancers, and theater personalities."

Renowned photographer Edward Weston moved to Carmel in 1929 and shot the first of numerous nature photographs, many set at Point Lobos, on the south side of Carmel Bay. In 1936, Weston became the first photographer to receive a Guggenheim Fellowship for his work in experimental photography. In 1948, after the onset of Parkinson's disease, he took his last photograph, an image of Point Lobos. Weston had traveled extensively with legendary photographer Ansel Adams, who moved to the Carmel Highlands in 1962, a few miles south of town.

Gray Gables, at Lincoln and Seventh was the birthplace of the Carmel Art Association, founded by artists Josephine Culbertson and Jennie V. Cannon.  This small group supported art, primarily through the auspices of the Carmel Arts and Crafts Club until 1927, when a meeting took place, and the group elected Pedro Joseph de Lemos as president and committed to building an exhibition gallery to display their works.  Their first show with 41 artists took place in October of the same year in the Seven Arts building of Herbert Heron.  The permanent gallery was completed in 1933 at its present location on Dolores Street.  In the early 1930s the tiny group claimed four members who had attained membership in the National Academy of Design.

G. H. Rothe, the Mezzotint painter, lived for a time in Carmel and built two studios there in 1979.

Music 

The Carmel Bach Festival began in 1935 as a three-day festival of concerts, expanding to 3 weeks until the 2009 Season which, due to economic concerns, was reduced to 2 weeks. The Festival is a celebration of music and ideas inspired by the historical and ongoing influence of J.S. Bach in the world.  For over 80 years the Festival has brought the music of the Baroque and beyond to communities of the Monterey Peninsula  and to music lovers from both the United States and abroad. Composed of nationally and internationally renowned performing artists, the Festival orchestra and chorale, along with a local chorus, perform in a variety of venues within Carmel including the Sunset Cultural Center and the Carmel Mission Basilica, and other venues throughout the Monterey Peninsula. The Festival schedule features full orchestral and choral works, individual vocal and chamber ensemble concerts, recitals, master classes, films, lectures and informal talks, in addition to interactive social and family events. Since 2011, artistic leadership has been provided by Paul Goodwin, Festival Music Director And Conductor.

The Monterey Symphony provides triple performances of a seven concert series as well as an extensive education program and special performances. It was founded in December 1946 in the Carmel home of its first president Grace Howden. It is currently led by Spanish conductor Max Bragado Darman who joined the orchestra in 2004. The music directors of the Monterey Symphony are Lorell McCann (1947–1953) and Clifford Anderson (1947–1954), Gregory Millar (1954–1959), Earl Bernard Murray (1959–1960), Ronald Ondrejka (1960–1961), John Gosling (1961–1967), Jan De Jong (1967–1968), Haymo Taeuber (1968–1985), Clark Suttle (1985–1998), Kate Tamarkin (1998–2004), and Max Bragado Darman (2004 to present).

The Sunset Arts Center was the venue for a concert by world-renowned jazz pianist Erroll Garner on September 19, 1955.  Unknowingly the concert was being discreetly recorded but when Martha Glaser, Erroll's Manager, found out she obtained the tapes and the famous Concert by the Sea album was produced.  This album sold over a million dollars worth of retail copies by 1958.

Government 
Carmel is a general law city governed by a mayor and four city council members. The current mayor is Dave Potter. Elected councilmembers are Carrie Theis, Jeff Baron, Bobby Richards and Jan Reimers. Chip Rerig is the newest City Administrator.

City's sphere of influence
The City of Carmel-by-the-Sea has established a "sphere of influence" that includes the communities of Carmel Woods, Hatton Fields, Mission Fields, Mission Tract, Carmel Point, and Carmel Hills. These neighborhoods are officially parts of unincorporated Monterey County, which provides most primary services, including law enforcement, street repairs, and public transit. Except for several shopping areas at the mouth of Carmel Valley, these satellite areas contain few, if any, businesses and serve primarily as bedroom communities to Carmel-by-the-Sea and the greater Monterey Peninsula.

Mail
There are no street addresses, and no home mail-delivery, in Carmel-by-the-Sea (by contrast with adjacent, "county-Carmel" residential districts).  Carmel-by-the-Sea residents may obtain the use of a U.S. Postal Service mailbox, free of charge, upon submitting annual proof of Carmel-by-the-Sea residence.

For non-mailing purposes (other than payment of property taxes, when parcel numbers are used), an individual property is identified on a geographical-location pattern (a fictitious example follows):  Sealion 5 NW Sea Otter.  In this example, the property is the 5th house on Sealion Street, northwest of Sea Otter Street.  Given Carmel's geographic orientation, this is the 5th house on the side of Sealion St. closer to the Pacific Ocean.

This unconventional mail system often leads to banks addressing their first mortgage statements undeliverably to the house's geographical location.

Unusual laws
Though often mistakenly thought of as an urban legend, the municipal code prohibits wearing shoes having heels taller than 2 inches (5.1 cm) or with a base of less than 1 square inch (6.5 cm2) unless the wearer has obtained a permit for them. While the local police do not cite those in violation of the ordinance, this seemingly peculiar law was authored by the city attorney in 1963 to defend the city from lawsuits resulting from wearers of high-heeled shoes tripping over irregular pavement distorted by tree roots.  Permits are available without charge at City Hall.

Argyll Campbell served as city attorney of Carmel from 1920 to 1937. He was responsible for drawing up many of Carmel's first zoning laws and ordinances. Campbell backed zoning ordinances that limited the business district and restricting the size of residential houses and lots. No sidewalks in the residential area, no streetlights, no commercial development on the beach, preservation of the native trees, one or two stories height limitation, no chain restaurants, and no billboards. These ordinances have helped preserve Carmel's character as a village.

County, state, and federal representation
On the Monterey County Board of Supervisors, Carmel is represented by Supervisor Mary Adams.
	

In the United States House of Representatives, Carmel is in California's 19th Congressional District, represented by Democrat Jimmy Panetta.

Education 
Carmel is served by the Carmel Unified School District which operates nearby schools including Carmel High School, Carmel Middle School, Tularcitos Elementary School  and Carmel River School.

Media

Carmel Pine Cone

The Carmel Pine Cone is the town's weekly newspaper and has been published since 1915, covering local news, politics, arts, entertainment, opinions and real estate. The newspaper also has a section called The Police Log that contains almost every report of a crime in the Carmel area, often read with a quaint twist of humor by readers since the contents of the log are fairly innocuous. Veteran CBS and NBC network news producer Paul Miller became publisher in 1997. In 2005, after failing to convince city officials to rezone a potential site for the Pine Cone's operation, he moved the paper's production offices to Pacific Grove, while maintaining a reduced news staff in downtown Carmel. The last Carmel office was closed in 2009 so the paper is no longer made in Carmel. In 2007, the paper began offering an PDF version of its complete newspaper on the Internet, which has attracted more than 9,000 subscribers, in addition to the newspaper's weekly print circulation of approximately 19,000.

The town was used as the prime location for the film The Forger in 2012.

Notable people

Actors 

 Jean Arthur, actress
 Barbara Babcock, actress
 Ian Bohen, actor
 Doris Day, actress, singer
 Phyllis Diller, actress, comedian
Clint Eastwood, actor, film director, mayor of Carmel 1986–1988
 Joan Fontaine, actress
 Brodie Greer, actor
 Craig Kilborn, entertainer, talk show host, comedian
 Sondra Locke (1944–2018), actress, film director
 Stephen Moorer, founder/actor with Pacific Repertory Theatre
Brad Pitt, actor, film producer 
 Dick Sargent, actor
 Jeremy Sumpter, actor
 Betty White (1922–2021), actress

Business leaders 
 Joseph Costello, businessman
 Ingemar Henry Lundquist, inventor and mechanical engineer, most notable for inventing over-the-wire balloon angioplasty
 Hugh W. Comstock, Carmel designer and builder
 Michael J. Murphy Carmel builder and businessman

Political leaders, politicians, civil service, activists 
 Saul Alinsky, community activist, writer and political theorist.
 Sam Farr, U.S. Congressman
Harvey Hancock, Richard Nixon's campaign manager, 1949–1952
Daniel W. Hand, US Army brigadier general
Caleb V. Haynes, USAF general
 Anne Henrietta Martin, first American woman to run for the United States Senate
Jeannette Rankin, first female U.S. Congresswoman
Walter S. Schuyler, U.S. Army brigadier general
Joseph Stilwell, U.S. Army general

Musicians 
 Erroll Garner, jazz pianist
 Carrie Lucas, R&B singer
 Michael Nesmith, musician, songwriter and filmmaker

Researchers, scholars 
 Francis Fukuyama, political scientist
 Alison Murray, biochemist and Antarctic researcher
 Ira Remsen, chemist
 Philip Schwyzer, a Shakespeare scholar

Sports 
 Jerry Colangelo, head of U.S.A. Basketball
 Andrew Franks, NFL kicker
 Atlee Hammaker, former pitcher for the San Francisco Giants.
 John Madden, football coach, TV sportscaster
 Jim Nantz, sports broadcaster
 Ryan Phinny, racing driver
 Kerry Woodson, professional baseball player

Visual artists, designers 
 Ansel Adams, photographer
 Gus Arriola, cartoonist
 Wah Ming Chang, Hollywood artist, designer/sculptor, Oscar winner
Eldon Dedini, cartoonist
 Eyvind Earle, artist, author, and illustrator
 Arnold Genthe, photographer
 Pauline Gibling Schindler, arts editor
 Charles Sumner Greene, architect and artist
 Paul Blaine Henrie, artist
 Hank Ketcham, cartoonist
 Xavier Martínez, painter
 William Frederic Ritschel, painter
 Esther Rose, Western artist
 John Edward Walker (1880–1940) California Impressionist painter.
Edward Weston, photographer
 Francis Whitaker, Carmel blacksmith artist, Forge in the Forest prior 1962
 Steven Whyte, sculptor
 Shirley Williamson (1875–1944) California Impressionist painter.

Writers, novelists, journalists 
 Mary Hunter Austin, novelist
 Eric Berne, psychiatrist and author
 Gelett Burgess, humorist, author
 Meg Cabot, author, wrote The Mediator series, staged in Carmel
 Beverly Cleary, author, notable books including fictional characters such as Ramona Quimby and Henry Huggins (1915-2021)
 James Ellroy, author
 Charlie Fern, former White House speech writer, journalist
 Colin Fletcher, writer
 Nora May French, poet
 Robert A. Heinlein, author
 Darrell Huff, author, writer, architect
 Robinson Jeffers, poet
 Christopher Kasparek, writer, translator, physician
 Anna Kavan, British novelist
 Charlotte Hoffman Kellogg (1874–1960), author and social activist who escorted Marie Curie to the U.S. in 1921
 Sinclair Lewis, novelist
 Jack London, novelist
 Hugo Schwyzer, writer and feminist
 Upton Sinclair, novelist and social reformer
 George Sterling, poet
 Lincoln Steffens, writer
 Robert Louis Stevenson, author
 Henry Meade Williams
 Mona Williams
 Charis Wilson (Weston), writer, model, and subject of Edward Weston's nude studies.

Other 
 Roy Chapman Andrews, naturalist and explorer
 Father Junipero Serra, a Roman Catholic Spanish priest, friar and missionary, of the Franciscan Order who founded a mission in Baja California and the first nine of 21 Spanish missions in California from San Diego to San Francisco Roman Catholic saint.
Blake Colburn Wilbur, surgeon

See also

 Coastal California
 Timeline of Carmel-by-the-Sea, California
 List of school districts in Monterey County, California
 List of tourist attractions in Monterey County, California
 List of Historic Buildings in Carmel-by-the-Sea

References

Further reading 
 HISTORIC CONTEXT STATEMENT CARMEL-BY-THE-SEA (1994)
 Carmel-by-the-Sea City Council Resolution no. 98, 1929
 Carmel-by-the-Sea Municipal Code Chapter 8.44 Permits For Wearing Certain Shoes
 Helen Spangenberg, Yesterday's Artists on the Monterey Peninsula, published by the Monterey Peninsula Museum of Art (1976)
 Herbert B. Blanks, Carmel-by-the-Sea, Yesterday, Today and Tomorrow (Report). City of Carmel-by-the-Sea. 1965
 John Ryan, Kay Ransom et al., City of Carmel-by-the-Sea General Plan prepared for the town of Carmel-by-the-Sea, Clint Eastwood, Mayor, by Earth Metrics Inc., San Mateo, California pursuant to requirements of the State of California (1984)
 Kay Ransom et al., Environmental Impact Report for the Carmel-by-the-Sea General Plan, Prepared for the town of Carmel-by-the-Sea by Earth Metrics Inc., Burlingame, California (1985)
 Marjory Lloyd, History of Carmel (1542–1966), 1966
 Seismic Safety Element of the General Plans of Carmel, Del Rey Oaks, Monterey, Pacific Grove and Seaside, William Spangle & Associates, September 29, 1975

External links

 
 

 
Cities in Monterey County, California
Populated coastal places in California
Populated places established in 1902
1902 establishments in California
Incorporated cities and towns in California